John Wallis "Jack" Rowe is an American businessman and academic physician, who served as Chairman and CEO of Aetna Inc., a large health insurance company based in Connecticut, titles he retired from in February 2006.

During his Aetna tenure, Businessweek named Rowe as a “Manager of the Year.” After leaving the company, he became an active philanthropist, supporting aging research and other causes.

Career

Columbia University
John Rowe is currently the Julius B. Richmond Professor at Columbia University's Mailman School of Public Health in the Department of Health Policy and Management. He has also served as professor at Harvard Medical School, authoring more than 200 scientific publications, mostly on the aging process.

Rowe was previously Chairman of the Board of Trustees at the University of Connecticut. In 2010, he donated $2 million to the university’s foundation for a program that encourages students from minority groups and low-income families to enter health professions. Rowe also gave a separate $1 million for aid to help students recover from the COVID-19 pandemic.

Aetna
Prior to Columbia, John Rowe was the CEO and executive chairman of the health insurance company Aetna from 2000 to 2006. During his tenure, he transformed Aetna into a large, profitable company. Between May 2001 and March 2007, the company's stock price jumped from $5.80 to $43.87 a share. By the mid-2000s, Aetna’s operating income recovered from a $300 million loss to a $1.7 billion gain. In 2005, Rowe's compensation was $22.2 million.

Mount Sinai New York Health
Prior to Aetna, Rowe was President and Chief Executive Officer of Mount Sinai New York Health from 1998 to 2000. Before that, he was President of The Mount Sinai Hospital and the Mount Sinai School of Medicine in New York City from 1988 to 1998.

In 1998, Rowe led the (now dissolved) Mount Sinai NYU Health merger that brought together five hospitals, becoming the system's president and chief executive.

Tax patents
In 2006, the Wealth Transfer Group sued Rowe for infringement of a tax patent. SOGRAT). The case was settled for undisclosed terms.

Publications
Rowe has published over 200 scientific publications, mostly in the field of gerontology, and a textbook in the same field.

He co-authored the book Successful Aging with Robert Kahn.

Personal life
Rowe lives in New York City and Cape Cod, Massachusetts with his wife, who is a retired professor at Fordham University.

Rowe attended Canisius College and received his B.S. in 1966. He received his M.D. from the University of Rochester in 1970.

Rowe has been a Director of the MacArthur Foundation Research Network on Successful Aging and is currently Director of the Foundation's Research Network on an Aging Society.

He is a member of the Institute of Medicine of the National Academy of Sciences, a fellow of the American Academy of Arts and Sciences, a member of the Board of Trustees of the Rockefeller Foundation, a member of the Board of Trustees of the Lincoln Center Theater, a member of the Board at Accolade Inc. and Hospital Corporation of America (HCA), and former Chairman of the Board of the Marine Biological Laboratory.

In 2019, Rowe was honored at the fourth Arthur W. Page Center Awards in New York City. He received a Larry Foster Award for Integrity in Public Communication.

Rowe is a former member of the Medicare Payment Advisory Commission and Board of Trustees at the University of Connecticut.

References

Fellows of the American Academy of Arts and Sciences
American geriatricians
University of Rochester alumni
Canisius College alumni
American businesspeople
Columbia University faculty
Harvard Medical School faculty
Living people
Aetna employees
Urban Institute people
1944 births
Members of the National Academy of Medicine